Guestward, Ho! is an American sitcom which aired on the ABC network in the 1960-1961 television season. It was based on the 1956 comic memoir of the same title by New Mexico dude ranch operator Barbara "Babs" Hooton, written in cooperation with Auntie Mame author Patrick Dennis. The series altered the characters' family name from "Hooton" to "Hooten."

Overview
The premise revolves around a New York City family, the Hootens, who tire of the urban lifestyle and relocate to operate  a dude ranch in New Mexico. Having bought the place unseen, they find it needs considerably more work than they were led to believe. The Hootens befriend the American Indian "Hawkeye" whose "trading post" was the only source of supplies in the vicinity. Hawkeye, played by J. Carrol Naish, was a rather cynical Indian who sold Indian-looking trinkets mass-produced in Asia, and who frequently read The Wall Street Journal, seemingly in search of a way to purchase the country and return it to its "rightful owners". Jeanette Nolan guest starred as Mrs. Winslow in the 1961 episode "Hawkeye's First Love".

Earle Hodgins appeared in at least three episodes as the 67-year-old ranch wrangler named "Lonesome". In the episode "Lonesome's Gal", ZaSu Pitts, formerly of The Gale Storm Show, played his romantic interest. Jody McCrea, whose Wichita Town, an NBC western series in which he starred with his father, Joel McCrea, ended in 1960, was cast as an Indian, "Danny Brave Eagle", in the 1961 episode entitled "The Wrestler".

The second episode was entitled "You Can't Go Home Again", borrowing from Thomas Wolfe's novel, You Can't Go Home Again. The series finale was "No Place Like Home".

Background
Guestward, Ho! initially began at CBS in 1958, with Vivian Vance and Leif Erickson as the Hootens, an older childless couple. Desilu had developed the pilot specifically for Vance, who had portrayed Ethel Mertz on the hit CBS/Desilu sitcom I Love Lucy from 1951 to 1957, and its later followup specials. Vance had rejected doing an I Love Lucy spin-off focusing on Ethel and Fred Mertz, in favor of doing the Guestward, Ho! pilot. However, upon viewing the pilot, CBS executives felt that Vance had become so typecast in her Ethel Mertz role that she was unconvincing playing a leading character in her own situation comedy; one executive allegedly said "I kept waiting for Lucy to come in" after viewing the pilot. As a result, CBS rejected the series.

Desilu eventually retooled the pilot, this time with Joanne Dru and Mark Miller as the Hottens, now a younger couple (with Babs being a former model). Flip Mark was cast as their son, Brook Hooten, a character created in the retooling. ABC bought this pilot, and slated it for its Thursday evening schedule with The Donna Reed Show. Ralston-Purina served as the primary sponsor, with 7 Up as an alternate sponsor.

The program ran opposite Outlaws on NBC, and later in the season, against fellow Desilu program The Ann Sothern Show on CBS. ABC ultimately canceled the series following one season, replaced with The Adventures of Ozzie and Harriet in its timeslot.

Guest stars

William Bakewell
Madge Blake
Frank Cady
Richard Deacon
Kathleen Freeman
Ned Glass
Charles Lane
Carole Mathews

Louis Nye
Stafford Repp
Natalie Schafer
Willard Waterman
Adam Williams
William Windom
Adam West

Episodes

See also 

 Green Acres
Bless This Mess (TV series)

References
Brooks, Tim and Marsh, Earle, The Complete Directory to Prime Time Network and Cable TV Shows 1946–Present

External links

 

American Broadcasting Company original programming
1960s American sitcoms
1960s American workplace comedy television series
1960 American television series debuts
1961 American television series endings
Television shows based on American novels
Television series by CBS Studios
Television shows set in New Mexico
Black-and-white American television shows
English-language television shows